The Valley is the capital of Anguilla, one of its fourteen districts, and the main town on the island. , it had a population of 3,269.

History

Historical landmarks
The Valley has few examples of colonial architecture due to the relocation of Anguilla's administration to St. Kitts in 1825, though Wallblake House, built in 1787, still stands and is used as a rectory by the adjacent church. New shops have opened in new buildings and renovated West Indian-style cottages. Old shops have been modernized and have enlarged their stocks as well as their space.

The ruins of the Old Court House are located on Crocus Hill, the island's highest point. All that remains are the broken walls of a few basement jail cells. At Cross Roads at the western edge of The Valley is Wallblake House, a plantation home built around 1787 that is now owned by the Catholic Church (the parish priest lives there) and St. Gerard's Catholic Church, with its highly original façade of pebbles, stones, cement, wood and tile.

Geography

Location
The town is located in the middle of the island, in front of Crocus Bay and nearby Crocus Hill, the island's highest point. Nearest villages are North Side, The Quarter, North Hill and George Hill.

Climate
The Valley has a tropical wet and dry climate (Aw) under the Köppen climate classification. The area has a short dry season that covers the months of February and March, and a wet season that covers the remainder of the year. However the wet season, though lengthy, does not quite see the heavy precipitation that is commonplace in other Caribbean cities such as Santo Domingo and San Juan. Average temperatures in The Valley are relatively constant throughout the year, ranging from 26–29 degrees Celsius.

Demography

Transport
The Valley is served by Clayton J. Lloyd International Airport (IATA: AXA, ICAO: TQPF) with some international flights.

Education
There are two government schools, Valley Primary School and Albena Lake-Hodge Comprehensive School (secondary).

Omololu International School, a primary and lower secondary private school, is in The Valley. It was Anguilla's first private school, and opened in 1994 as the Teacher Gloria Omololu Institute. It adopted its current name on 1 April 2013. It uses the International Baccalaureate (IB) curriculum. The name "Omululu" means "Child of God" in the Yoruba language.

Notable people
Cardigan Connor (born 1961), cricketer
Kieran Kentish (born 1987), Anguillan former international footballer
Carlos Newton (born 1976), mixed martial artist
Omari Banks (born 1982), West Indies Cricketer
Zharnel Hughes (born 1995), British sprinter

See also
Ronald Webster Park
St. Gerard Church, The Valley

References

External links

 Map of The Valley

 
Populated places in Anguilla
Capitals in the Caribbean
Capitals of British Overseas Territories
Capitals of former nations